Feingold is a surname that may refer to:

 Benjamin Feingold (1899–1982)
 Feingold diet, named after Benjamin
 David Sidney Feingold (1922–2019), an American biochemist and winner of the Israel Prize
 Eleanor Feingold, American statistical geneticist
 Kenneth Feingold (born 1952), American artist
 Leon Feingold (born 1973), American baseball player
 Marco Feingold (1913–2019), Austrian Holocaust survivor
 Michael Feingold (1945=2022), American critic, translator, lyricist, and playwright
 Russ Feingold (born 1953), American politician
 McCain-Feingold Bill, see Bipartisan Campaign Reform Act
 Sharon Feingold. American voice actress

Surnames
Jewish surnames
Yiddish-language surnames